The 1988 Asia Cup (also known as the Wills Asia Cup) was the third Asia Cup tournament, held in Bangladesh between 26 October and 4 November 1988. Four teams took part in the tournament: India, Pakistan, Sri Lanka and the host nation Bangladesh. The matches were the first-ever List A-classified being played in Bangladesh, then an Associate Member of the International Cricket Council (ICC), their opponents all being Full Members.

The 1988 Asia Cup was a round-robin tournament where each team played the other three once, and the top two teams qualifying for a place in the final. India and Sri Lanka qualified for the final in which India defeated Sri Lanka by 6 wickets to win its second Asia Cup.

Squads

Matches

Group stage

Final

Statistics

Most runs

Most wickets

See also
 Asia Cup

References

 CricInfo: Asia Cup in Bangladesh (Bdesh Ind Pak SL) : Oct/Nov 1988 http://usa.cricinfo.com/db/ARCHIVE/1980S/1988-89/OD_TOURNEYS/ASIA/

External links
 Tournament page at ESPN Cricinfo
 

Asia Cup
Asia Cup
International cricket competitions from 1988–89 to 1991
International cricket competitions in Bangladesh
Asia Cup
Asia Cup